The Richmond River Express Examiner was a weekly newspaper published in Casino, New South Wales, Australia. It has been previously published as The Richmond River Express, The Kyogle Examiner,  The Rosolen Press , The Richmond River Express and Casino Kyogle Advertiser and The Richmond River Express and Tweed Advertiser.

History
The Richmond River Express and Tweed Advertiser was Casino's first newspaper and was first published on 23 December 1870 by Robert Gordon Balmer. In 1904 the name was changed to The Richmond River Express and Casino Kyogle Advertiser which was shortened to The Richmond River Express in 1929.  The Express was published as a daily from 1929 to 1955 when a fire destroyed the printing plant. In 1978 the Express merged with The Kyogle Examiner and became The Richmond River Express Examiner. The Examiner is currently published by The Northern Star. The current editor is Susanna Freymark.

Digitisation
The paper has been digitised as part of the Australian Newspapers Digitisation Program project of the National Library of Australia.

See also
 List of newspapers in Australia
 List of newspapers in New South Wales

References

External links
 
 

Newspapers published in New South Wales
Newspapers on Trove
Weekly newspapers published in Australia